Ergenzingen is a suburban district of Rottenburg am Neckar in the administrative district of Tübingen in Baden-Württemberg (Germany).

Geography 

Ergenzingen is located 12 km (7.45 mi) western from Rottenburg am Neckar, 11 km (6.83 mi) southeastern from Nagold and 13 km (8.07 mi) northeastern from Horb am Neckar. The elevation is 436 to 499 m.

Extent 

The territory of the district is 1004 hectares. Thereof fall 70.4% upon agriculturally used area, 11% upon forest area, 18.3% upon settlement area and roads and 0.3% upon other.

Population 

The population of Ergenzingen counts 4166 people (31/01/08). So Ergenzingen is the largest district of Rottenburg. At an area of 10.04 km² (3.9 sq mi) this corresponds to a population density of 415 people per km², or 1,075 per sq mi.

Faiths 

The population of the village is predominantly Roman Catholic.

Politics

Sister villages 
 Gols (Austria) since 2000

References

External links 
Official Webpage (German)

Rottenburg am Neckar